The Main Street Banking Historic District is a national historic district located in downtown Richmond, Virginia. The district encompasses 19 contributing buildings located south of the Virginia State Capitol and west of the Shockoe Slip Historic District. It is the location of a number of buildings built for or occupied by banking institutions. The district includes representative examples of the Late Victorian and International Style architecture built between about 1865 and 1965. Notable buildings include the Virginia Employment Commission Building (1960), the 700 Building (1964), the Ross Building (1964), the Fidelity Building (1965). Located in the district is the separately listed First National Bank Building.

It was added to the National Register of Historic Places in 2005, with a boundary increase in 2013.

References

Historic districts on the National Register of Historic Places in Virginia
Commercial buildings on the National Register of Historic Places in Virginia
Victorian architecture in Virginia
International style architecture in Virginia
Buildings and structures in Richmond, Virginia
National Register of Historic Places in Richmond, Virginia